Three vessels of the United States Navy have been named USS San Francisco, after the city of San Francisco, California.

 The first  was a protected cruiser commissioned in 1890, converted to a minelayer in 1908, and decommissioned in 1921.
 The second  was a heavy cruiser commissioned in 1934, active throughout the Pacific War, and decommissioned in 1946.
 The third  is a  nuclear attack submarine commissioned in 1981 and taken out of active service in 2017.

See also
  was an oiler that served in the U.S. Navy from 1947 to 1957.

United States Navy ship names